Festuca litvinovii is a species of grass in the family Poaceae. It is native to Amur, China North-Central, Chita, Inner Mongolia, Khabarovsk, Manchuria, Mongolia, Qinghai, and Xinjiang. It is perennial and mainly grows on temperate biomes. Festuca litvinovii was first published in 1976.

References

litvinovii
Flora of Amur Oblast
Flora of China
Flora of Chita Oblast
Flora of Mongolia
Flora of Khabarovsk Krai
Flora of Manchuria
Flora of Qinghai
Flora of Xinjiang
Plants described in 1976